Janji is a Kainji language of Nigeria.

Numerals
Janji has, or had, a duodecimal number system.

References

East Kainji languages
Languages of Nigeria